Fderik Airport  is an airport serving the town of Fderik in Mauritania.

See also
Transport in Mauritania

References

 OurAirports - Mauritania
  Great Circle Mapper - Fderik
 Fderik
 Google Earth

Airports in Mauritania